The judge advocate general of the Canadian Forces (JAG) is the senior legal officer who superintends the administration of military justice in the Canadian Armed Forces, and provides legal advice on military matters to the governor general, the minister of national defence, the Department of National Defence and the Canadian Armed Forces. The office is defined in section 9 of the National Defence Act.

The 15th and current judge advocate general is Rear Admiral Geneviève Bernatchez, since June 28, 2017.

Office of the Judge Advocate General 
The office consists of 159 regular force legal officer positions and 64 reserve force legal officer positions. Regular force legal officers are deployed as follows:

National Defence Headquarters in Ottawa
 Eight Assistant Judge Advocate General (AJAG) offices: Esquimalt, Edmonton, Winnipeg, Toronto, Montreal, Halifax, NORAD HQ (USA), and Germany.  
 Ten Deputy Judge Advocate (DJA) offices across Canada
 Four Regional Military Prosecutor (RMP) offices across Canada
 Canadian Forces Military Law Centre at the Royal Military College of Canada (RMC) in Kingston, Ontario
 Deputy Commander-in-Chief North American Aerospace Defence Command Headquarters (in Colorado Springs, Colorado, United States)
 with CF contingents deployed overseas
 in training with CF formations and units participating in major national and international exercises.

List of judge advocates general
 Major-General Henry Smith, 1911-1918
 Lieutenant-Colonel Oliver Mowat Biggar, 1918-1920
 Brigadier Reginald John Orde, 1920-1950
 Brigadier-General William J. Lawson, 1950-1969
 Brigadier-General Harold A. McLearn, 1969-1972
 Brigadier-General James M. Simpson, 1972-1976
 Major-General John Patterson Wolfe, 1976-1982
 Brigadier-General Frank Karwandy, 1982-1986
 Brigadier-General Robert L. Martin, 1986-1990
 Commodore Peter R. Partner, 1990-1993
 Brigadier-General Pierre G. Boutet, 1993-1998
 Major-General Jerry S.T. Pitzul, 1998-2006
 Brigadier-General Ken Watkin, 2006-2010
 Major-General B. Blaise Cathcart, 2010-2017
 Rear-Admiral Geneviève Bernatchez, 2017-

See also
 Courts-martial of Canada

United States
 Judge Advocate General's Corps

United Kingdom
 Judge Advocate of the Fleet
 Judge Advocate General (United Kingdom)

References

External links
 Judge Advocate General of the Canadian Armed Forces

Canadian Armed Forces
Legal history of Canada
Legal occupations in the military
Canada